Xerse (Xerxes) is an opera in three acts by Giovanni Bononcini. It was designated as a dramma per musica. The libretto was written by Silvio Stampiglia after that by Nicolò Minato which had been used for the 1654 opera of the same name by Francesco Cavalli. Stampiglia's version was in turn used as the basis for Handel's Serse.

Stampiglia's version keeps to the story used by Minato but there are major differences in the way the work as a whole is structured.

Performance history

The opera was first performed in Rome at the Teatro di Tor di Nona on 25 January 1694.

Roles

References

Lindgren, Lowell (1992), "Xerse (ii)" in The New Grove Dictionary of Opera, ed. Stanley Sadie (London)

External links
 

Operas by Giovanni Bononcini
Italian-language operas
1694 operas
Operas
Operas based on real people
Operas set in ancient Persia
Cultural depictions of Xerxes I